George Bryan Cooper (June 6, 1808 – August 29, 1866) was a politician from the U.S. state of Michigan.

Early life 
Cooper was born in Long Hill Township, New Jersey, where he attended the public schools. He moved to Ann Arbor, Michigan in 1830, and later to Jackson in 1835.  In Jackson he engaged in mercantile pursuits and became postmaster of Jackson from 1836 to 1846.

Political career 
He was a member of the Michigan State Senate 4th District, 1837–1838.  He established an iron foundry at Jackson in 1840 and served in the Michigan State House of Representatives in 1842.  He served as State Treasurer of Michigan from March 17, 1846 to March 13, 1850.  He engaged in banking at Jackson in 1851.

In 1858 he defeated incumbent Republican William Alanson Howard to be elected as a Democrat from Michigan's 1st congressional district to the Thirty-sixth Congress, serving from March 4, 1859, until May 15, 1860. Howard contested the results in the U.S. House, alleging voting irregularities in several wards. Following its investigation, the House Committee on Elections reported that the sitting member, Cooper, was not entitled to his seat and that the contestant Howard was. The House passed resolutions to that effect on May 15, 1860, at which time Howard took the oath of office.

After Cooper's removal from office, he resided at New Bedford in Wall Township, New Jersey until his death.

References

The Political Graveyard

1808 births
1866 deaths
People from Long Hill Township, New Jersey
Democratic Party members of the United States House of Representatives from Michigan
State treasurers of Michigan
Democratic Party Michigan state senators
Democratic Party members of the Michigan House of Representatives
People from Wall Township, New Jersey
19th-century American politicians
Members of the United States House of Representatives removed by contest